Raef Andrew LaFrentz (born May 29, 1976) is an American former professional basketball power forward and center who played for the Denver Nuggets, Dallas Mavericks, Boston Celtics, and Portland Trail Blazers of the National Basketball Association (NBA). Born and raised in Iowa, LaFrentz attended the University of Kansas and was drafted in 1998 by the Denver Nuggets. He was known for his perimeter shooting and his shot blocking abilities. In 2020 LaFrentz became an assistant basketball coach at Decorah High School in Decorah, Iowa.

Career

High school

Raef LaFrentz attended MFL MarMac High School located in Monona, Iowa. His father, Ron, was an assistant coach on LaFrentz's high school team. He was named to the USA Today All-USA 1st Team in 1994 and was a high school McDonald's All-American.

During the summer before his freshman year at the University of Kansas, LaFrentz was selected to the 1994 U.S. Olympic Festival North Team and averaged 11.8 ppg. and 6.8 rpg.

College

LaFrentz played basketball at Kansas, finishing in 1998. He played with future NBA Hall of Famer Paul Pierce and journeyman Scot Pollard while at Kansas. The 1996-97 team finished the season ranked #1 in the country, but lost to Arizona (led by future NBA stars Jason Terry and Mike Bibby) in the Regional Semifinal. He was a four-year starter and an All-American in his junior and senior seasons. He joined Tim Duncan and Shaquille O'Neal as the only players in the 1990s to earn first team AP All-America honors twice.

Compiling career averages of 15.8 ppg and 9.1 rpg while shooting 55.5 percent from the floor overall, he concluded his career ranked second all-time at Kansas in points with 2,066 and rebounds with 1,186, and left trailing only Danny Manning in both categories.

Accumulating a record of 123–17 (87.9 winning percentage) over his four seasons, he was part of a senior class that won more games over a four-year period than any class in KU history.

Named by the A.P. in 1997 and 1998 the Big 12 Conference Player of the Year, he was also tabbed All-Big 12 Conference first team by both the media and coaches his final two seasons.

LaFrentz became the first KU player in 27 years to average a double-double over an entire season when he posted 19.8 ppg and 11.4 rpg averages as a senior in 1997-98, leading the Jayhawks to a 35–4 record.

NBA

The third overall pick by the Denver Nuggets in the 1998 NBA Draft, LaFrentz averaged 13.8 ppg., 7.6 rpg. and 1.4 bpg. but played in just 12 games as a rookie and missed the majority of the season after suffering a torn ACL in his left knee against Dallas on February 25, 1999. Successfully returning from the torn ACL to start 80 of his 81 appearances in 1999–2000, he averaged 12.4 ppg., an NBA 25th best 7.9 rpg. and ranked eighth in the NBA in blocked shots, averaging 2.2 bpg. LaFrentz also played in the 2000 NBA All-Star Weekend. He played on the NBA All-Star Weekend Rookie Challenge Sophomore Roster. It was the first ever Sophomore team to play in the rookie challenge. It was there at NBA All-Star Weekend that LaFrentz was on the receiving end of Jason Williams' legendary "elbow pass". LaFrentz was unable to score on the play due to being fouled. In his third year (2000–01), he started 74 of the 78 games he played in and averaged 12.9 ppg., while ranking seventh in the league in blocks at 2.6 bpg., tied for 25th in rebounding with a 7.8 rpg. average, and tied for 27th in field goal percentage (career high .477).

LaFrentz was traded by the Nuggets with Nick Van Exel, Avery Johnson, and Tariq Abdul-Wahad to the Dallas Mavericks for Juwan Howard, Donnell Harvey, Tim Hardaway and a 2002 first-round pick on February 21, 2002. He finished the 2001–02 season second in the NBA in blocked shots per game.

LaFrentz played for the US national team in the 2002 FIBA World Championship.

The Celtics acquired LaFrentz from the Dallas Mavericks, along with Chris Mills, Jiri Welsch and a first-round draft choice, in exchange for Tony Delk and Antoine Walker on October 20, 2003. On June 28, 2006, the Boston Celtics traded LaFrentz, guard Dan Dickau, and the number seven pick in the 2006 NBA draft to the Portland Trail Blazers for center Theo Ratliff and guard Sebastian Telfair.  The number 7 pick (Randy Foye) was later traded by the Blazers for the number 6 pick (Brandon Roy) in a draft day trade.

Career highlights and awards
College
 NCAA Division I men's basketball player with 2000 points and 1000 rebounds
 NCAA Men's Basketball Consensus All-Americans (1997, 1998)
 Kansas Jayhawks Retired Basketball Jersey #45
 Big 12 Conference Men's Basketball Player of the Year
NBA
 Third Overall pick in the 1998 NBA Draft
 Played in 2000 NBA All-Star Weekend
 Led Western Conference in Blocks (2001–02)
 Led Western Conference in Blocks per game (2001–02)
 Played on United States men's national basketball team (2002)
NBA Records
 Most blocks in an NBA All-Star Weekend Rookie Challenge Game
 Most blocks per game in NBA All-Star Weekend Rookie Challenge history

Career statistics

NBA

Regular season 

|-
| align="left" | 
| align="left" | Denver
| 12 || 12 || 32.3 || .457 || .387 || .750 || 7.6 || .7 || .8 || 1.4 || 13.8
|-
| align="left" | 
| align="left" | Denver
| 81 || 80 || 30.1 || .446 || .328 || .686 || 7.9 || 1.2 || .5 || 2.2 || 12.4
|-
| align="left" | 
| align="left" | Denver
| 78 || 74 || 31.5 || .477 || .367 || .698 || 7.8 || 1.4 || .5 || 2.6 || 12.9
|-
| align="left" | 
| align="left" | Denver
| 51 || 51 || 32.7 || .466 || .434 || .667 || 7.4 || 1.2 || .6 || 3.0 || 14.9
|-
| align="left" | 
| align="left" | Dallas
| 27 || 25 || 29.1 || .437 || .305 || .761 || 7.4 || 1.1 || .9 || 2.2 || 10.8
|-
| align="left" | 
| align="left" | Dallas
| 69 || 43 || 23.3 || .518 || .405 || .682 || 4.8 || .8 || .5 || 1.3 || 9.3
|-
| align="left" | 
| align="left" | Boston
| 17 || 1 || 19.3 || .460 || .200 || .769 || 4.6 || 1.4 || .5 || .8 || 7.8
|-
| align="left" | 
| align="left" | Boston
| 80 || 80 || 27.5 || .496 || .364 || .811 || 6.9 || 1.2 || .5 || 1.2 || 11.1
|-
| align="left" | 
| align="left" | Boston
| 82 || 63 || 24.8 || .431 || .392 || .680 || 5.0 || 1.4 || .4 || .9 || 7.8
|-
| align="left" | 
| align="left" | Portland
| 27 || 9 || 13.0 || .382 || .087 || .769 || 2.6 || .3 || .3 || .4 || 3.7
|-
| align="left" | 
| align="left" | Portland
| 39 || 0 || 7.5 || .443 || .000 || .579 || 1.7 || .2 || .3 || .4 || 1.7
|- class="sortbottom"
| style="text-align:center;" colspan="2"| Career
| 563 || 438 || 25.8 || .466 || .363 || .711 || 6.1 || 1.1 || .5 || 1.6 || 10.1

Playoffs 

|-
| align="left" | 2002
| align="left" | Dallas
| 8 || 8 || 30.6 || .500 || .333 || .545 || 7.6 || .6 || .3 || 2.8 || 11.3
|-
| align="left" | 2003
| align="left" | Dallas
| 20 || 16 || 24.6 || .433 || .200 || .842 || 4.4 || .3 || .6 || 2.2 || 8.0
|-
| align="left" | 2005
| align="left" | Boston
| 7 || 7 || 26.4 || .390 || .500 || .800 || 4.9 || 1.1 || .9 || 1.7 || 6.9
|- class="sortbottom"
| style="text-align:center;" colspan="2"| Career
| 35 || 31 || 26.3 || .446 || .297 || .750 || 5.2 || .5 || .5 || 2.2 || 8.5

College 

|-
| style="text-align:left;"| 1994–95
| style="text-align:left;"| Kansas
| 31 || 31 || 23.6 || .534 || .400 || .637 || 9.7 || 7.5 || .5 || .3 || 11.4
|-
| style="text-align:left;"| 1995–96
| style="text-align:left;"| Kansas
| 34 || 34 || 27.0 || .543 || .286 || .661 || 8.2 || .4 || .9 || .8 || 13.4
|-
| style="text-align:left;"| 1996–97
| style="text-align:left;"| Kansas
| 36 || 36 || 38.9 || .584 || .167 || .761 || 9.3 || .7 || .9 || 1.3 || 18.5
|-
| style="text-align:left;"| 1997–98
| style="text-align:left;"| Kansas
| 30 || 30 || 30.2 || .548|| .471 || .738  || 11.4 || 1.0 || .9 || 1.5 || 19.8
|- class="sortbottom"
| style="text-align:center;" colspan="2"| Career
| 131 || 131 || 27.5 || .555 || .371 || .712 || 9.1 || 0.7 || 0.7 || 1.1 || 15.8

See also
List of NCAA Division I men's basketball players with 2000 points and 1000 rebounds

References

External links

 NBA.com Profile - Raef LaFrentz
 SI.com profile
 Hoops Hype profile

1976 births
Living people
2002 FIBA World Championship players
All-American college men's basketball players
American men's basketball players
Basketball players from Iowa
Boston Celtics players
Centers (basketball)
Dallas Mavericks players
Denver Nuggets draft picks
Denver Nuggets players
High school basketball coaches in Iowa
Kansas Jayhawks men's basketball players
McDonald's High School All-Americans
Parade High School All-Americans (boys' basketball)
People from Clayton County, Iowa
People from Hampton, Iowa
Portland Trail Blazers players
Power forwards (basketball)
United States men's national basketball team players